A J Mintu is a Bangladeshi film director and has won the Bangladesh National Film Award for Best Director four times.

Education
Mintu studied at the Gopal Chandra Institution (GCI) High School in Pabna.

Filmography
 Protigga (1980)
 Maan Somman (1983)
 Lalu Mastan (1987)
 Satya Mithya (1989)
 Pita Mata Santan (1991)
 Ashanti (1996)
 Banglar Bodhu (1993)
 Prothom Prem (1994)
 Baper Taka (1995)
 Shanti Chai (1996)

References

External links
 

Living people
Bangladeshi film directors
Best Director National Film Award (Bangladesh) winners
Year of birth missing (living people)
Best Screenplay National Film Award (Bangladesh) winners